Ricardo da Benta was a Portuguese rower. He competed in the men's eight event at the 1948 Summer Olympics.

References

Year of birth missing
Year of death missing
Portuguese male rowers
Olympic rowers of Portugal
Rowers at the 1948 Summer Olympics
Place of birth missing